Fantomas contra los vampiros multinacionales is a comic book by Julio Cortázar published in 1975. The book mimics film noir-style comic book stories with speculative fiction to expound the evils of multinational corporations. It was inspired in part by the Mexican comic adaptations of Fantômas, a popular arch-villain from French crime fiction.

1975 novels
Works by Julio Cortázar
Spanish graphic novels
Fantômas